Comet is an American digital broadcast television network owned by the Sinclair Television Group subsidiary of the Sinclair Broadcast Group. The network focuses on science fiction with some supernatural, horror, adventure and fantasy series and films, sourced mainly from the Metro-Goldwyn-Mayer film and television library. Sinclair also owns Charge! (action), Stadium (sports joint venture) and TBD (youth) broadcast networks. Comet is also available via Apple TV, FuboTV, YouTubeTV, Roku, Sling TV, Dish Network and Sinclair's Stirr.

History

On June 29, 2015, Metro-Goldwyn-Mayer and the Sinclair Broadcast Group's broadcasting and programming subsidiary Sinclair Television Group, Inc. announced the expected 4th quarter launch of the then-unnamed science fiction network. Sinclair chief operating officer David Amy, in announcing the partnership, noted that MGM "has an extensive collection of science fiction films and television movies that appeal to a vast audience who will now be able to access that content through broadcast television". Sinclair tapped its television stations in many of the 79 markets where the company owned or operated a broadcasting property at the time of the announcement to serve as the network's initial charter affiliates. On August 5, 2015, in its financial report for the second fiscal quarter, Sinclair Broadcast Group announced that the new network would be named Comet.

The network formally launched on October 31, 2015 at 7AM (ET) with an airing of Johnny Sokko and His Flying Robot. The 1984 sci-fi/action film The Terminator and the 1979 sci-fi-themed James Bond film Moonraker were its premiere night programming.

In early March 2017, the network started OTT streaming as a Roku channel and on Apple TV. Sony's PlayStation Vue add the network to its Core package in late 2018. The network was a launch channel of Sinclair's streaming service, Stirr, in January 2019. Comet was added to Sling TV on February 20, 2019.

As of 2020, along with Sibling network Charge!, Comet is now Owned-and-operated by Sinclair as MGM sold their Operation stake in the Two networks.

Programming
Comet currently provides up to 18 hours of programming to its owned-and-operated and affiliated stations on weekdays from 9:00 a.m. to 3:00 a.m. Eastern Time and weekends from 11:00 a.m. to 3:00 a.m. Eastern Time. The remaining vacated hours are occupied by paid programming.

Comet draws from the extensive library of films and television programming owned by Metro-Goldwyn-Mayer and subsidiary United Artists, carrying more than 1,500 hours worth of sci-fi programming from the studio.

The network's programming consists of content from science fiction, horror, fantasy and other related genres, with a mix of theatrically released feature films and select off-network series from the 1960s to the 2000s (such as The Ray Bradbury Theater and the 1990s revival of The Outer Limits). This gives Comet a more demographically targeted format than on competitive networks such as MeTV, Heroes & Icons, Antenna TV and Decades, which maintain a general entertainment programming format. Along with its sister terrestrial television networks and the regional network channel owned by Sinclair, Bally Sports, Comet airs infomercials at late night and early morning hours.

Recently, Comet started airing The X-Files, which select episodes of the show can be available to stream on Sister service Stirr, alongside other Comet shows such as Stargate SG-1, Farscape, Quantum Leap, The Outer Limits, Sliders, Battlestar Galactica, and Buffy the Vampire Slayer. However, viewers can expect content censorship on programming that has been aired uncensored on other over-the-air media outlets, including muting slurs and mild swearing and pixilation of rear-end nudity and blood and gore.

Business
Comet is the first national multicasting venture by Sinclair, which aimed to develop content for the 162 television stations it ran at the time (many of which are operated through management outsourcing agreements with stations that Sinclair owns outright). Following an earlier effort in 2011, with its acquisition of the Ring of Honor wrestling promotion, Sinclair launched the American Sports Network programming in 2014, and entered into a production investment and development deal with the Michael Eisner-owned Tornante Company on the day that Comet's then-upcoming launch was announced.

The network operates in a similar fashion to a shared services agreement that is usually formed between two local TV stations, but in this case between a programmer-distributor and owner & station group. The network is offered on barter basis with the network with nine minutes of ad and the affiliate with five per hour with the ability to revenue share if MGM sells the local portion of the ads on behalf of the station. The network does not rely on the rating system, as most diginets do, using direct-response commercials in determining viewership.

Affiliates

In October 2015, for its debut, Comet had affiliation agreements with television stations covering 60% of the United States (or 150,891,489 households with at least one television set). By July  2016, the network had grown to 72 markets covering 72% of U.S. TV households.

Sinclair Broadcast Group initially planned to launch Comet on select television stations owned by the company (including those operated through outsourcing agreements with partner companies Deerfield Media, Howard Stirk Holdings, and Cunningham Broadcasting). The network also intended to seek carriage on the digital subchannels of television stations owned by other broadcasting companies. Titan Broadcast Management and Tribune Broadcasting were the first outside Sinclair operated stations to affiliate some of their stations with Comet.

Due to its co-ownership by Sinclair, some of the group's stations (as well as others not run by Sinclair, Deerfield, Howard Stirk, or Cunningham that are affiliated with the syndication service) may elect to pre-empt certain afternoon or evening programs within the national Comet schedule to carry telecasts from the Sinclair-owned American Sports Network. This capacity is currently utilized by Sinclair for many of its Fox, The CW and MyNetworkTV and other affiliated subchannels as an alternate outlet to air events not being carried by the affiliate's main channel.

See also
 Syfy – American cable and satellite network owned by NBCUniversal, featuring science fiction, fantasy, drama and horror programming.
 Syfy Universal – international version of Syfy serving countries in Europe and Latin America.
 CTV Sci-Fi Channel – a similarly formatted cable and satellite channel in Canada, owned by Bell Media

References

External links
 

Television networks in the United States
Classic television networks
Nostalgia television in the United States
English-language television stations in the United States
Television channels and stations established in 2015
2015 establishments in the United States
Sinclair Broadcast Group